A right fielder, abbreviated RF, is the outfielder in baseball or softball who plays defense in right field. Right field is the area of the outfield to the right of a person standing at home plate and facing towards the pitcher's mound. In the numbering system used to record defensive plays, the right fielder is assigned the number 9.

Position description 

Outfielders must cover large distances, so speed, instincts and quickness to react to the ball are key. They must be able to catch fly balls above their head and on the run, as well as prevent balls hit down the right field foul line from getting past them. Being situated 250–300 feet from home plate, they must be able to throw the ball accurately over a long distance to be effective. Of all outfield positions, the right fielder often has the strongest arm, because they are the farthest from third base.

As well as the requirements above, the right fielder backs up first base on all throws from the catcher and pitcher, when possible, and all bunted balls, since the catcher or the first baseman must be available for fielding the ball. The right fielder backs up second base on any ball thrown from the left side of the field, i.e. shortstop, third base, or foul line territory. The right fielder backs up first base when the first baseman is in a run down between 3rd base and home.

Right field has developed a reputation in Little League for being a position where weaker players can be "hidden" from the action. Unlike the Major League level where players routinely hit the ball in all directions and distances, most Little League players do not hit the ball into the outfield on a regular basis. Additionally, since right-handed batters—who tend to hit the ball in the left direction—are far more common than left-handed batters, the left fielder (and to lesser degree the center fielder) tend to have much more opportunities to make a play than the right fielder.

Popular culture 
The reputation of right field being a position for unathletic players was further brought into the mainstream by children’s entertainer, picture book author and recording artist Willy Welch's song "Playing Right Field", which was popularized by Peter, Paul and Mary as simply "Right Field" for their 1986 album No Easy Walk to Freedom, and as a Pizza Hut commercial in 1990. Both the song and commercial feature an awkward Little Leaguer bored out in right field, when the batter hits a ball and the right fielder (to everyone's surprise) successfully catches it, breaking the stigma that right fielders are weaker players.

In the children's comic strip Peanuts, Lucy Van Pelt is the right fielder on Charlie Brown's team, and she often misses catches or gets distracted from the game.

Hall of Fame right fielders

Hank Aaron
Roberto Clemente
Sam Crawford
Kiki Cuyler
Andre Dawson
Elmer Flick
Vladimir Guerrero
Tony Gwynn
Harry Heilmann
Harry Hooper
Reggie Jackson
Al Kaline
Willie Keeler
King Kelly
Chuck Klein
Tommy McCarthy
Mel Ott
Sam Rice
Babe Ruth
Frank Robinson
Enos Slaughter
Sam Thompson
Larry Walker
Paul Waner
Dave Winfield
Ross Youngs

See also

 Baseball Hall of Fame
 Gold Glove Award
 Outfielder

References

Baseball positions
Softball

fr:Voltigeur de droite